Phillips Gybbon (11 October 1678 – 12 March 1762), of Hole Park, Rolvenden, in Kent, was an English Whig politician who sat in the House of Commons between 1707 and 1762. 

Gybbon was the son of Robert Gybbon of Hole Park, and his wife Elizabeth Phillips, daughter of John Phillips of St. Clement Danes. He travelled abroad in Holland and Germany and entered Middle Temple in 1694. He succeeded his father in 1719.

Gybbon entered Parliament in 1707 as Whig Member of Parliament for Rye, and represented the constituency until his death 55 years later, eventually becoming Father of the House of Commons from 1749. Early in his career he was appointed a Commissioner of Revenue in Ireland, and in the 1720s was Chairman of the Committee of Privileges and Elections. From 1726 to 1730, he was Surveyor-General of Land Revenues. 
For the next few years he was in opposition, supporting Pulteney against Robert Walpole's administration. On Walpole's fall in 1742, Gybbon was appointed a Lord of the Treasury in Wilmington's government, retaining the post after Henry Pelham replaced Wilmington in 1743 but losing office in the reshuffle after Carteret was sacked at the end of 1744.

He died in 1762, having married Catherine, the daughter of Honor Bier, with whom he had an only daughter. She left Hole Park to a Mrs Jefferson who was married to a John Beardsworth.

References

 
 Lewis Namier & John Brooke, The History of Parliament: The House of Commons 1754-1790, London: HMSO, 1964)

|-

1678 births
1762 deaths
People from Rolvenden
Members of the Parliament of Great Britain for English constituencies
Whig (British political party) MPs for English constituencies
British MPs 1707–1708
British MPs 1708–1710
British MPs 1710–1713
British MPs 1713–1715
British MPs 1715–1722
British MPs 1722–1727
British MPs 1727–1734
British MPs 1734–1741
British MPs 1741–1747
British MPs 1747–1754
British MPs 1754–1761
British MPs 1761–1768